Linda Gray Sexton is an American writer.

Early life
She was born in Newton, Massachusetts, the elder daughter of poet Anne Sexton and Alfred Muller "Kayo" Sexton.

Career
In 1994, she wrote her memoirs of growing up with her mother, titled Searching for Mercy Street: My Journey Back to My Mother, Anne Sexton.

She has written several novels and edited posthumous editions of her mother's works.  She wrote another memoir, titled Half in Love: Surviving the Legacy of Suicide, published in January 2011, and Erica Jong has written "Linda Sexton’s beautiful book is a cry for health and sanity. It will bring hope and understanding because it explains the way suicide blights families from generation to generation.”

Bibliography 
Between Two Worlds: Young Women in Crisis (1979) [non-fiction]
Rituals (1983) [novel]
Points of Light: A Novel (1988)
Mirror Images (1990) [novel]
Anne Sexton: A Self-Portrait in Letters (with Lois Ames, 1992)
Private Acts (1993)[novel]
Searching for Mercy Street: My Journey Back to My Mother, Anne Sexton (1994) [memoir]
Half in Love: Surviving the Legacy of Suicide (2011) [memoir]
Bespotted: My Family's Love Affair with Thirty-Eight Dalmatians (2014)

References

Sources
 Kakutani, Michiko, "A Daughter Revisits Sexton's Bedlam", The New York Times, October 14, 1994
 Sexton, Anne, Anne Sexton: A Self-portrait in Letters, edited and annotated by Lois Ames and Linda Gray Sexton, Houghton Mifflin Harcourt, 2004.

External links

1953 births
Living people
Writers from Newton, Massachusetts
American memoirists
American women memoirists
20th-century American novelists
20th-century American women writers
21st-century American women writers
American women novelists
Novelists from Massachusetts
20th-century American non-fiction writers
21st-century American non-fiction writers